Keneseth Israel is a Conservative synagogue in Louisville, Kentucky. The congregation's original synagogue building was constructed in Louisville in 1928. It was designed by Joseph & Joseph and was listed on the National Register of Historic Places.
The original synagogue building suffered extensive damage in a fire in 2021 and after a structural assessment, was demolished.

History
The congregation was founded in 1882 as an Orthodox congregation, B'nai Jacob, and merged with another orthodox congregation, Beth HaMedrash HaGadol in 1927 to create congregation Keneseth Israel. In 1928 the congregation had a synagogue built at 232–236 East Jacob Street in Louisville. The congregation moved to its current home in 1964.

The earliest building was a former church.  In 1901, the congregation, then B'nai Israel, dedicated a new building on the site of the former church building at 432 E. Jefferson Street.  The building has twin towers with pyramid-form roofs and was strongly stripped in red-and-white in the Moorish Revival style then fashionable for synagogues.

For most of its history, Keneseth Israel was an Orthodox synagogue affiliated with the Union of Orthodox Jewish Congregations of America. In 1994, its members voted to affiliate with the United Synagogue of Conservative Judaism, leaving Anshei Sfard as the only remaining Orthodox-affiliate congregation in Louisville.

Clergy
The congregation is led by Rabbi Ben Freed and Cantor Sharon Hordes.

See also
 National Register of Historic Places listings in Downtown Louisville, Kentucky
 Keneseth Eliyahoo Synagogue

References

External links
 Keneseth Israel website

Synagogues in Louisville, Kentucky
Religious organizations established in 1882
Moorish Revival architecture in Kentucky
Conservative synagogues in the United States
Moorish Revival synagogues
National Register of Historic Places in Louisville, Kentucky
Synagogues on the National Register of Historic Places in Kentucky
Demolished buildings and structures in Louisville, Kentucky
1882 establishments in Kentucky
Synagogues completed in 1928
1928 establishments in Kentucky
Demolished but still listed on the National Register of Historic Places
Buildings and structures demolished in 2021
Burned religious buildings and structures in the United States
Fires in Kentucky